The 46th Street station was a station on the demolished BMT Fifth Avenue Line. It was served by trains of the BMT Fifth Avenue Line in Brooklyn, New York City. It had 2 tracks and 1 island platform. The station was built on October 1, 1893, and despite the name of the line was actually located on Third Avenue and 46th Street. The next stop to the north was 40th Street. The next stop to the south was 52nd Street. It closed on May 31, 1940. Current rapid transit service in this area can be found one block east and then another block north at the 45th Street station on the underground BMT Fourth Avenue Line.

References

 Fifth Avenue El

BMT Fifth Avenue Line stations
Railway stations in the United States opened in 1893
Railway stations closed in 1940
Former elevated and subway stations in Brooklyn
Sunset Park, Brooklyn